Antonio Peña Promotions, S.A. de C.V. d/b/a Lucha Libre AAA Worldwide is a Mexican Lucha Libre (professional wrestling) promotion based in Mexico City, Mexico. Commonly referred to as  simply AAA (pronounced "triple A"; an abbreviation of its original name Asistencia Asesoría y Administración, Spanish for "Assistance, Assessment, and Administration"), the promotion was founded in 1992 when Antonio Peña broke away from Consejo Mundial de Lucha Libre (CMLL) to set up a promotion, which allowed him more creative freedom. AAA has held a number of pay-per-views (PPV) over the years and has promoted shows not just in Mexico but in the United States and Japan as well.

In addition to the conventional "squared circle", the promotion occasionally uses a hexagonal wrestling ring and has a reputation for its outlandish gimmicks and characters as well as having developed a more extreme match style in recent years. Over the years, AAA has worked together with several American promotions, while currently having working relationships with other Mexican promotions.

History

AAA dates from May 15, 1992, when Consejo Mundial de Lucha Libre (CMLL) booker Antonio Peña broke with the company in favor of establishing his own group along with Konnan and much of the young and exciting talent from CMLL. This left CMLL with a middle-aged roster and a seemingly bleak future. AAA also looked for talent from other markets, as they found and signed Tijuana natives Rey Mysterio, Jr. and Psicosis. The promotion flourished with top talent like El Hijo del Santo, Octagón, Blue Panther, the Casas brothers (Negro Casas and Heavy Metal) and possessed top draws in Los Gringos Locos, Cien Caras, Konnan, and Perro Aguayo. The rising popularity of AAA soon caused rival Universal Wrestling Association to go out of business, and Peña quickly signed up top draws including El Canek, Dos Caras and Los Villanos.

AAA's "golden years" (from 1993–1995) peaked with the When Worlds Collide pay-per-view, promoted in conjunction with World Championship Wrestling (WCW) and broadcast in the United States in 1994. Weeks after the show, Art Barr (a key member of Los Gringos Locos) died while visiting his family. As a result, AAA vacated the AAA Tag Team Championships, and this led to the departure of fellow stable-mates (in Los Gringos Locos) Eddie Guerrero and Madonna's Boyfriend. El Hijo del Santo also departed as a result of creative problems, and stars such as Fuerza Guerrera and Blue Panther soon left too when the Mexican economy began to slow down (which resulted in the company's inability to offer as much work). Many wrestlers, including Rey Misterio, Jr., Psicosis, La Parka, and Juventud Guerrera, would also depart to WCW in 1996, as well as Konnan's short-lived Promo Azteca promotion. In early 1997, AAA established a working agreement with the World Wrestling Federation, but the only significant outcome resulted in several luchadores featuring in the 1997 Royal Rumble. In the mid-1990s the name of the company was changed to simply be "AAA", pronounced "Triple A" as the company bought out Televisa and became independent.

AAA broadcasts shows regularly on Gala TV in Mexico and Univision TDN in Mexico and parts of the United States.

On October 6, 2006, founder Antonio Peña died of a heart attack. Following Peña's death his sister Marisela Peña manages AAA financially, while Peña's brother-in-law Joaquín Roldán and his son, Dorian Roldán Peña serve as operational managers. In 2008 Lucha Libre USA presented AAA's second U.S. pay-per-view, Legendary Battles of Triplemania. In 2009 AAA announced the official release of a video game originally entitled AAA El Videojuego. The game was later retitled Lucha Libre AAA: Héroes del Ring by the publisher of the game, with a release date of October 12, 2010.

AAA developed a working relationship with Total Nonstop Action Wrestling in 2004. Through the relationship, AAA sent the luchadores Juventud Guerrera, Héctor Garza, Abismo Negro, Heavy Metal, and Mr. Águila to TNA to compete in the America's X-Cup Tournament as a contingent known as Team Mexico. Team Mexico dominated the America's X-Cup Tournament, defeating Team USA in the first round before retaining the Cup against both Team Canada and Team Britain. They eventually lost at the World X-Cup, which saw Team USA defeat Team Canada and Team Mexico in the Ultimate X finals to win the Cup. For multiple reasons TNA and AAA broke off their working relationship late in 2004. TNA continued utilizing luchadores, but opted to contract them individually as opposed to working through AAA. In 2006, AAA and TNA teamed up again for an event in Toreo de Cuatro Caminos, utilizing some of TNA's talent and stage (which includes the tunnel and lasers). After Konnan left TNA in June 2007, any chance of a working relationship disappeared, especially given that Konnan has filed a racial discrimination lawsuit against TNA. The lawsuit was later dismissed. TNA would later start a relationship with CMLL from 2007 to 2009, however TNA would once again start working together with AAA and exchange talent in February 2010.

On January 12, 2014, it was announced that, with the backing of Mark Burnett, AAA would begin airing a show on American network El Rey in the second half of the year. The one-hour weekly program would be accompanied by monthly and quarterly specials as well as live pay-per-views. The show, titled Lucha Underground, premiered on October 29, 2014.

Beginning in March 2015, the company announced that it would be known as "Lucha Libre AAA Worldwide" from that point on, although it is still referred to mainly as AAA or "Triple A".

On April 8, 2017, AAA General Manager Joaquín Roldán died.

On 14 June, AAA began airing on FrontRunnerTV in the UK.

In April and May 2018, some fighters like Teddy Hart, Juventud Guerrera and Taurus make their return to the company wearing their Elite League jerseys, dealing with a possible alliance between AAA and Liga Elite. On June 4 in Verano de Escándalo, Jeff Jarrett (now a member of WWE Hall of Fame) makes his comeback after 3 years out of AAA, where he beat Rey Wagner and Rey Mysterio Jr. to win the AAA Mega Championship with the help from Konnan who also makes his comeback after 2 years.

On February 1, 2019, AAA announced the breakup relationship with Televisa after 27 years changing to the Multimedios television station. However, on February 3 after the Super Bowl LIII broadcasts had concluded, AAA reached an agreement with TV Azteca to broadcast their show in Azteca 7. On April 4, 2019, AAA announced in press conference that its first event in the United States called Invading NY that would be held in Madison Square Garden on September 15, 2019. Later in the press conference AAA announced that would also held its second event in United States which is named Invading Los Angeles with the event taking place at The Forum in Inglewood, California on October 13, 2019. On August 16, 2019, it was reported by Pro Wrestling Insider that AAA decided to run Hulu Theater instead of Madison Square Garden after meeting with MSG executives to move the venue of the event due to its poor ticket sales.

In mid-March 2020, AAA began canceling or postponing its televised events following the COVID-19 pandemic, so the following month, a tournament called Lucha Fighters was created consisting of 12 luchadores and 8 luchadoras.

During the indefinite recess due to health contingency due to the COVID-19 pandemic in Mexico, on July 20, 2020, AAA announced its project called "AutoLuchas" which consists of a events in Autódromo Hermanos Rodríguez where fans could see through from a car. On September 24, AAA announced that it would return to its first performances in early October after the announced project.

On February 2, 2021, the company signed an alliance with SECTUR to promote Mexico's tourist destinations. bearing the name of the tour as "Lucha por la Identidad Nacional" including shows such as Rey de Reyes and Verano de Escándalo.

On August 14, Triplemanía XXIX was held at the Arena Ciudad de México, marking the first event with the return of fans but limited, this for biosecurity reasons. After this, Héroes Inmortales XIV was the second show that had an audience present, also albeit limited.

Contracts

International partnerships
In 1997, the company did business with United States's World Wrestling Federation (now WWE) promotion, bringing in a number of AAA wrestlers for the Royal Rumble event and namesake match.

In April 2014, after TNA founder Jeff Jarrett, the man behind the AAA-TNA relationship, had left the company, he announced that his new Global Force Wrestling (GFW) promotion would begin working with the Mexican promotion though TNA and AAA would continue to work with each other being a part of the Lucha Libre World Cup on May 24, 2015. When Jarrett returned to TNA in 2017, with the promotion now known as Impact Wrestling, it was announced that AAA and Impact would once again continue to be working together.

In July 2015, Canadian-based International Wrestling Syndicate (IWS) announced a talent partnership with AAA.

In June 2018, AAA partnered with Mexican Lucha Libre Elite promotion officially announced a working relationship.

In August 2018, AAA started a working agreement with American-based promotion Major League Wrestling (MLW).

In February 2019, it was announced that AAA would be partnering with All Elite Wrestling (AEW).

In 2020, Lucha Libre Factory Made Ventures, one of the producers of Lucha Underground, filed a lawsuit with AAA; claiming to have exclusive rights to distribute AAA events and merchandise outside of Mexico.

Shows and tournaments
Each year AAA promotes a number of signature events and tournaments: some shown as pay-per-view events and others presented as TV Azteca television specials. The annual shows and tournaments, shown in order of occurrence during each year, include:

Special tournaments

Championships and accomplishments

Since its inception AAA has placed very few restrictions on the number of championships it promotes, often allowing wrestlers to defend titles that do not technically belong within AAA, such as titles from the now defunct Universal Wrestling Association. While they allowed these to be defended and used to promote their wrestlers they're not officially listed as AAA titles and thus do not appear on this list. In December 2008 AAA announced it they will no longer recognize or promote any title that does not belong to AAA - ending the long-standing practice.

Current championships

Retired championships

Other accomplishments

See also

List of professional wrestling promotions in Mexico
List of Lucha Libre AAA Worldwide personnel
List of former Lucha Libre AAA Worldwide personnel
AAA Hall of Fame

Notes

References

External links 

  
 AAA at Galavisión
 AAA Title Histories

 
Mexican professional wrestling promotions
Mexican companies established in 1992
Organizations established in 1992